The Rotary River Ride is a non-competitive bicycle ride held next to the Yarra River in Melbourne, Victoria, Australia. Money raised helps finance the efforts of the Rotary in Australia.

The event consists of three options, which primarily follow the Yarra River Trail:
  Gold route
  Silver route
  Bronze route

See also

Cycling in Victoria

References 

Cycling in Melbourne
Rotary International
Cycling events in Victoria